Hemigrammopetersius is a genus of African tetras that contains two described species.

Species
Hemigrammopetersius barnardi (Herre, 1936) (Barnard's robber)
Hemigrammopetersius pulcher (Boulenger, 1909)

References
 

Alestidae
Fish of Africa
Taxa named by Jacques Pellegrin